Jeong Chung-geun (born 1 March 1995) is a South Korean professional footballer who plays for K League 1 club Gyeongnam.

Career
After playing for various youth teams in his native South Korea, Jeong moved to the Nantes academy in France in 2010. Between 2013 and 2016, he would compete for the reserve team in the fourth-tier Championnat National 2.

Jeong Chung-geun joined J2 League club Yokohama FC on 20 December 2016. He made 52 appearances for the club, scoring three goals. From July 2018 to December 2018, he was loaned to league rivals Fagiano Okayama. In 2019, he signed with Machida Zelvia, who also competed in the second division. After 52 second division games, he returned to South Korea in early 2021. There, he signed a contract with Suwon in the K League 1.

Ahead of the 2022 season, Jeong joined Gyeongnam after being part of a swap deal involving Chang Hyuk-jin.

Club statistics
Updated as of 2022 season.

References

External links

1995 births
Living people
People from Pohang
South Korean footballers
Pohang Steelers players
FC Nantes players
Championnat National 2 players
J2 League players
K League 1 players
K League 2 players
Yokohama FC players
Fagiano Okayama players
FC Machida Zelvia players
Suwon FC players
Gyeongnam FC players
Association football midfielders
Expatriate footballers in France
South Korean expatriates in France
South Korean expatriate sportspeople in France
Expatriate footballers in Japan
South Korean expatriates in Japan
South Korean expatriate sportspeople in Japan
Sportspeople from North Gyeongsang Province